Şahika Tekand (born 1959) is a Turkish actress. She has appeared in more than fifteen films since 1987.

Biography
Tekand graduated from the Fine Arts Faculty, Department of Theatre and Acting at the Dokuz Eylül University in 1984 and received her PhD in 1986.

Selected filmography

References

External links 

1959 births
Living people
Turkish film actresses